This is a list of years in Estonian television.

Twenty-first century

Twentieth century

See also 
 List of years in television

References 

Television
Television in Estonia by year
Estonian television